The Watchman is a 1961 novel by American author Davis Grubb.

Story line and development
The novel, set in the town of Adena, West Virginia concerns the dark family secret of Sheriff Luther Alt, and his daughters Jill and Chris. When Cole Blake is murdered, events get out of hand.

Editions 
 Charles Scribner's Sons, 1961. This was Grubb's second novel for Scribner's

Reviews 
Louis Grubb in his preface to You Never Believe Me quotes Time Magazine's review of the novel: "The latest of the author's marrow chilling tales of good and evil—a mixture of poetic rage against cruelty in man, a song of praise of physical love, a cry of despair at the blows dealt to the innocent young".

References

1961 American novels
American crime novels
Novels by Davis Grubb
Novels set in Appalachia
Novels set in West Virginia
Charles Scribner's Sons books